Filantropica (alternate spellings Philanthropy, Philanthropique) is a 2002 Romanian dark comedy film directed by Nae Caranfil and starring Mircea Diaconu. Critically acclaimed and considered a landmark film of the Romanian New Wave, it is described as a "comedy about corruption and greed and how to get a free meal in fancy restaurants". Caranfil, the director, has a cameo appearance as a karaoke singer, singing Frank Sinatra's "My Way".

Plot

Ovidiu Gorea is a jaded high-school teacher and novice writer in his mid-40s who is still living with his parents. He has just published a collection of short stories titled Nobody Dies for Free that the bookstores reject because no one buys it.

The high school principal asks him to deal with a problem-student, Robert. Ovidiu has Robert call one of his parents for talks, but the boy sends his sister, Diana, a gorgeous teenager, instead. Ovidiu is smitten. He convinces Diana to go on a date with him, but what he thinks will be a quiet evening over coffee turns into a bar-hopping binge that leaves him nearly broke.

One night, he meets a shabby-looking drunk beggar who offers to recite poems in exchange for vodka. The two start talking and Ovidiu learns that the guy makes two or three times more money than him in a month out of this. He asks for an explanation and the beggar refers him to the Filantropica Foundation.

Located in a desolate basement, the Filantropica Foundation is actually the lair of Bucharest's beggars' leader, Pavel Puiuț. A former convict, he realized that begging leads nowhere "unless there is a touching story behind the hand that begs", so he created an organized network of beggars, each with an invented, tear-jerking, background story that yields millions. Puiuț listens to Ovidiu's story and thinks he is perfect for his new "project".

He pairs Ovidiu with Miruna, his secretary, and sends them to high-profile restaurants, where, in collusion with a waiter, they pose as a couple of poor teachers celebrating their wedding anniversary who find, at the end of their dinner, that they don't have enough money to cover the check; Ovidiu is responsible with making a scene that would strike a chord with one of the rich people present, who would pick up their check out of pity; later, out in the back, Ovidiu, Miruna, and the waiter would split the money.

After several such performances, Ovidiu makes enough money to impress the materialistic Diana. He rents a roadster, takes her to lakeshore clubs, and impresses her friends, his sole purpose being sleeping with her. The reluctant Puiuţ even gives him access to the foundation's "show-house" (a day-rental house meant to impress third parties), but a poorly timed customer call gives Ovidiu's cover away and an angry Diana leaves him.

Meanwhile, Miruna falls for her partner in crime and is angry that he keeps "bitching" about that "bimbo", instead of going for a "real woman". She manages to get him into her bed and Ovidiu is surprised to find out she is a former prostitute.

The next day, an enamored Miruna convinces Ovidiu to play the scam for their own benefit and actually enjoy a dinner out. The ploy goes terribly wrong when they go to a karaoke bar, where due to the loud music, their scene has no effect and the waiter, who is not in on it, takes Ovidiu to the back and beats him.

Meanwhile, in school, Ovidiu is visited by two thugs who ask him about Robert, who owes $3,000 to "a person" and who only has two days to make good. Ovidiu withdraws the amount from the foundation's account, calls Diana and gives her the money for her brother. She pretends being impressed and teases Ovidiu by telling him to visit her later that night. Naturally, she deceives him once more, by leaving the city in the afternoon. To top it off, Ovidiu finds Robert in a park, turned into a beggar, who tells him that "Diana" was not his sister, just "some chick".

Now $3,000 short, Ovidiu goes home to find the media and Puiuț claiming he has just won the big prize in the lottery. It is again one of Puiuț's scams, who reminds Ovidiu he "has him" because of the $3,000. Ovidiu accepts his fate and Miruna as his wife.

The movie has an ominous ending, with Puiuț finding Robert in the street, convincing him to join his operation and then breaking the fourth wall: "Do you feel pity for this piece of trash? Hah! Got your money!".

Cast
 Mircea Diaconu as Ovidiu Gorea
 Gheorghe Dinică as Pavel Puiuț
 Mara Nicolescu as Miruna Stan
  as Diana Dobrovicescu
 Marius Florea Vizante as Bulache
 Florin Zamfirescu as Poet of Gara de Nord
 Constantin Drăgănescu as Mr. Gorea
  as Mrs. Gorea
 Florin Călinescu as himself
  as Waiter
  as Thug #1
 Liviu Timuș as Thug #2
  as Bucescu
 Mihaela Mitrache
 Mimi Brănescu
 
 
 
 Nae Caranfil

Reception
Philanthropy, along with the likes of The Death of Mr. Lazarescu (2005), has been cited as a landmark film of the Romanian New Wave. It has been described as "the first Romanian fiction film to receive European money. The film was lauded by critics, who particularly praised the dark humor and wit of the script. It won the Young European Jury Award at the Mons International Festival of Love Films, the Public Prize at the Paris Film Festival, the  Special Jury Award at Wiesbaden goEast in 2002 and the Audience Award at the Würzburg International Filmweekend in 2003. Dominique Nasta, author of Contemporary Romanian Cinema: The History of an Unexpected Miracle, describes the film as a "devastating, hyperbolic black comedy about a Bucharest begging mafia thriving through emotional manipulation".

References

External links
 

2002 films
2002 black comedy films
Films about writers
Films directed by Nae Caranfil
Films set in Bucharest
Romanian comedy films
2002 comedy films